The Agam bow-fingered gecko (Cyrtodactylus agamensis) is a species of gecko endemic to Sumatra. Rösler et al. (2007) revalidated this species, but is of doubtful origin, since their diagnosis was based on a single female.

References

Cyrtodactylus
Reptiles described in 1860